Anarcho-syndicalism is a political philosophy and anarchist school of thought that views revolutionary industrial unionism or syndicalism as a method for workers in capitalist society to gain control of an economy and thus control influence in broader society. The end goal of syndicalism is to abolish the wage system, regarding it as wage slavery. Anarcho-syndicalist theory generally focuses on the labour movement. Reflecting the anarchist philosophy from which it draws its primary inspiration, anarcho-syndicalism is centred on the idea that power corrupts and that any hierarchy that cannot be ethically justified must be dismantled.

The basic principles of anarcho-syndicalism are solidarity, direct action (action undertaken without the intervention of third parties such as politicians, bureaucrats and arbitrators), and direct democracy or workers' self-management. Anarcho-syndicalists believe their economic theories constitute a strategy for facilitating proletarian self-activity and creating an alternative cooperative economic system with democratic values and production centred on meeting human needs. Anarcho-syndicalists perceive the primary purpose of the state as the defence of private property in the forms of capital goods and thereby of economic, social and political privilege. In maintaining this status quo, the state denies most of its citizens the ability to enjoy material independence and the social autonomy that springs from it.

History

Origins 
The roots of anarcho-syndicalism lie in the anarchist faction of the International Workingmen's Association (IWA), which upheld the central role of trade unions in the class struggle and called for a general strike to replace the state with a free association of producers. This was in opposition to the Marxist faction, which proposed the seizure of state power by a political party. 

The IWA's largest section was the Spanish Regional Federation (FRE), which adopted the anarchist platform of revolutionary trade unionism and organised itself according to a structure that anticipated syndicalism. The FRE was driven underground following the suppression of the FRE-led Petroleum Revolution in 1873, after which they were succeeded by a series of syndicalist unions such as the Federation of Workers of the Spanish Region (FTRE) and the Union and Solidarity Pact (PUS). The FRE's syndicalist model was also taken up by Cuban anarchists, who established their own union federations to organise Cuban workers and recently-emancipated slaves. In the United States, the anarchists of the International Working People's Association (IWPA) also adopted the syndicalist platform of Albert Parsons and established a large trade union federation in Chicago. Despite its suppression after the Haymarket affair, the IWPA was strongly influential on the development of syndicalism (described as "anarchism made practical") and left behind a legacy commemorated in International Workers' Day. Anarchists also participated in the trade union movement in Mexico, where they established the Mexican Workers' General Congress (CGOM) and dedicated it towards using unions as their vehicle for social revolution.

While the influence of the anarchists was strong in the Spanish and American labour movements, most of Europe's trade unions fell under the control of social-democratic political parties. During the 1880s, a period of economic growth had encouraged the development of reformist tendencies such as social democracy, resulting in the sidelining of the anarchists, who had largely neglected labour organisation in favour of individual acts of "propaganda of the deed". 

But the technological innovations achieved during the Second Industrial Revolution also preceded a simultaneous rise in profits and decline of wages, while new management strategies resulted in the increase of both workload and working time. Increasing levels of the division of labour brought with it a rise in alienation among workers, which led to the development of calls for workers' self-management and workers' control over the means of production. Even as strike actions became more common around the world, social-democratic union leaders remained largely reluctant to engage in strikes and limited the decision-making power of individual members through internal bureaucracy. Despite protests by the membership, these centralised trade unions often preferred to form compromised "wage agreements" with their employers rather than risk opening their accumulated strike fund. The moderate tendencies of the union leadership eventually provoked widespread dissillusionment among the rank-and-file union members, with some such as Karl Roche coming to characterise paid union officials as a new upper class.

Increasing tensions between the union leadership and membership led to the development of a current that had by now become known as syndicalism, which called for workers themselves to take direct action in order to improve their own material conditions. Anarchists also began to move away from insurrectionism and back towards the labour movement, increasingly promoting syndicalism as a "practical form of organisation for the realisation of anarchist-communism" and even beginning to capture some unions from the social-democrats.

International Workers' Association 

The CNT started small, counting 26,571 members represented through several trade unions and other confederations. In 1911, coinciding with its first congress, the CNT initiated a general strike that provoked a Barcelona judge to declare the union illegal until 1914. Also, in 1911, the trade union adopted its name formally. From 1918 on, the CNT grew more substantial and had an outstanding role in the events of the La Canadiense general strike, which paralyzed 70% of the industry in Catalonia in 1919, the year the CNT reached a membership of 700,000. These  are credited with killing 21 union leaders in 48 hours.

In 1922, the International Workers' Association (IWA) was founded in Berlin, and the CNT joined immediately, but with the rise of Miguel Primo de Rivera's dictatorship, the labour union was outlawed again the following year. However, with the workers' movement resurgent following the Russian Revolution, what was to become the modern IWA was formed, billing itself as the "true heir" of the original International. The successful Bolshevik-led revolution of 1917 in Russia was mirrored by a wave of syndicalist successes worldwide, including the struggle of the Industrial Workers of the World (IWW) in the United States alongside the creation of mass anarchist unions across Latin America and massive syndicalist-led strikes in Germany, Portugal, Spain, Italy and France, where it was noted that "neutral (economic, but not political) syndicalism had been swept away". The final formation of this new international, then known as the International Workingmen's Association, took place at an illegal conference in Berlin in December 1922, marking an irrevocable break between the international syndicalist movement and the Bolsheviks.

The first secretaries of the International included the famed writer and activist Rudolph Rocker, along with Augustin Souchy and Alexander Schapiro. Following the first congress, other groups from France, Austria, Denmark, Belgium, Switzerland, Bulgaria, Poland, and Romania were affiliated. Later, a bloc of unions in the United States, Colombia, Peru, Ecuador, Guatemala, Cuba, Costa Rica and El Salvador also shared the IWA's statutes. The IWW, biggest syndicalist union in the United States, considered joining but eventually ruled out affiliation in 1936 based on the IWA's religious and political affiliation policies. Although not anarcho-syndicalist, the IWW was informed by developments in the broader revolutionary syndicalist milieu at the turn of the 20th century. At its founding congress in 1905, influential members with strong anarchist or anarcho-syndicalist sympathies like Thomas J. Hagerty, William Trautmann and Lucy Parsons contributed to the union's overall revolutionary syndicalist orientation. Although the terms anarcho-syndicalism and revolutionary syndicalism are often used interchangeably, the anarcho-syndicalist label was not widely used until the early 1920s: "The term 'anarcho-syndicalist' only came into wide use in 1921–1922 when it was applied polemically as a pejorative term by communists to any syndicalists…who opposed increased control of syndicalism by the communist parties". Translations of the original statement of aims and principles of the IWA (drafted in 1922) refer not to anarcho-syndicalism but revolutionary syndicalism or revolutionary unionism.

The Biennio Rosso (English: "Red Biennium") was a two-year period between 1919 and 1920 of intense social conflict in Italy following World War I. The Biennio Rosso took place in a context of economic crisis at the war's end, with high unemployment and political instability. It was characterized by mass strikes, worker manifestations, and self-management experiments through land and factory occupations. In Turin and Milan, workers' councils were formed, and many factory occupations took place under the leadership of anarcho-syndicalists. The agitations also extended to the agricultural areas of the Padan plain and were accompanied by peasant strikes, rural unrest, and guerilla conflicts between left-wing and right-wing militias. According to libcom.org, the anarcho-syndicalist trade union Unione Sindacale Italiana (USI) "grew to 800,000 members and the influence of the Italian Anarchist Union (20,000 members plus Umanita Nova, its daily paper) grew accordingly [...] Anarchists were the first to suggest occupying workplaces".

Many of the most prominent members of the IWA were broken, driven underground or wiped out in the 1920s–1930s as fascists came to power in states across Europe, and workers switched away from anarchism towards the seeming success of the Bolshevik model of socialism. In Argentina, the FORA had already begun to decline by the time it joined the IWA, having split in 1915 into pro and anti-Bolshevik factions. From 1922, the anarchist movement there lost most of its membership, exacerbated by further splits, most notably around the Severino Di Giovanni affair. It was crushed by General Uriburu's military coup in 1930. Germany's FAUD struggled throughout the late 1920s and early 1930s as the Brownshirts took control of the streets. Its last national congress in Erfurt in March 1932 saw the union attempt to form an underground bureau to combat Adolf Hitler's fascists; a measure never implemented as mass arrests decimated the conspirators' ranks. The editor of the FAUD organ Der Syndikalist, Gerhard Wartenberg, was killed in the Sachsenhausen concentration camp. Karl Windhoff, delegate to the IWA Madrid congress of 1931, was driven out of his mind and also died in a Nazi death camp. There were also mass trials of FAUD members held in Wuppertal and Rhenanie; many of these never survived the death camps. Italian IWA union USI, which had claimed a membership of up to 600,000 people in 1922, was waning due to murders and repression from Benito Mussolini's fascists. It had been driven underground by 1924, and although it could still lead significant strikes by miners, metalworkers and marble workers, Mussolini's ascent to power in 1925 sealed its fate. By 1927, its leading activists had been arrested or exiled.

Portugal's CGT was driven underground after an unsuccessful attempt to break the newly installed dictatorship of Gomes da Costa with a general strike in 1927 that led to nearly 100 deaths. It survived underground with 15–20,000 members until January 1934, when it called a general revolutionary strike against plans to replace trade unions with fascist corporations, which failed. It continued in a much-reduced state until World War II but was effectively finished as a fighting union. Massive government repression repeated such defeats worldwide as anarcho-syndicalist unions were destroyed in Peru, Brazil, Colombia, Japan, Cuba, Bulgaria, Paraguay and Bolivia. By the end of the 1930s, legal anarcho-syndicalist trade unions existed only in Chile, Bolivia, Sweden and Uruguay. However, perhaps the most tremendous blow was struck in the Spanish Civil War, which saw the CNT, then claiming a membership of 1.58 million, driven underground with the defeat of the Spanish Republic by Francisco Franco. The sixth IWA congress took place in 1936, shortly after the Spanish Revolution had begun, but was unable to provide serious material support for the section. The IWA held its last pre-war congress in Paris in 1938; with months to go before the German invasion of Poland, it received an application from ZZZ, a syndicalist union in the country claiming up to 130,000 workers—ZZZ members went on to form a core part of the resistance against the Nazis and participated in the Warsaw uprising. However, the International was not to meet again until 1951, six years after World War II had ended. During the war, only one member of the IWA could continue to function as a revolutionary union, the SAC in Sweden. In 1927, with the "moderate" positioning of some cenetistas (CNT members), the Federación Anarquista Ibérica (FAI), an association of anarchist affinity groups, was created in Valencia. The FAI would play an essential role during the following years through the so-called trabazón (connection) with the CNT; that is, the presence of FAI elements in the CNT, encouraging the labour union not to move away from its anarchist principles, an influence that continues today.

Post–World War II era 

After World War II, an appeal in the Fraye Arbeter Shtime, detailing the plight of German anarchists, called for Americans to support them. By February 1946, sending aid parcels to anarchists in Germany was a large-scale operation. In 1947, Rudolf Rocker published Zur Betrachtung der Lage in Deutschland (Regarding the Portrayal of the Situation in Germany) about the impossibility of another anarchist movement in Germany. It became the first post-World War II anarchist writing to be distributed in Germany. Rocker thought young Germans were cynical or inclined to fascism and awaited a new generation to grow up before anarchism could bloom again in the country.

Nevertheless, the Federation of Libertarian Socialists (FFS) was founded in 1947 by former FAUD members. Rocker wrote for its organ, Die Freie Gesellschaft, which survived until 1953. In 1949, Rocker published another well-known work. On 10 September 1958, Rocker died in the Mohegan Colony. The Syndicalist Workers' Federation was a syndicalist group active in post-war Britain and one of the Solidarity Federation's earliest predecessors. It was formed in 1950 by members of the dissolved Anarchist Federation of Britain. The Confédération nationale du travail (CNT, or National Confederation of Labour) was founded in 1946 by Spanish anarcho-syndicalists in exile with former members of the CGT-SR. The CNT later split into the CNT-Vignoles and the CNT-AIT, the French section of the IWA.

At the seventh congress in Toulouse in 1951, a much smaller IWA was relaunched without the CNT, which would not be strong enough to reclaim membership until 1958 as an exiled and underground organization. Delegates attended, though primarily representing tiny groups, from Cuba, Argentina, Spain, Sweden, France, Italy, Germany, the Netherlands, Austria, Denmark, Norway, Britain, Bulgaria and Portugal. A message of support was received from Uruguay. However, the situation remained difficult for the International as it struggled to deal with the rise of state-sanctioned economic trade unionism in the West, heavy secret service intervention as Cold War anti-communism reached its height and the banning of all strikes and free trade unions in the Soviet Union bloc of countries. In 1956, the SAC withdrew from the IWA, following a dispute over the distribution of state unemployment benefits, which the IWA had opposed. This led to the SAC developing a more moderate orientation, as it began to advocate for participation in municipal elections. For most of the next two decades, the international struggled to rebuild itself. In 1976 at the 15th congress, the IWA had only five member groups, two of which (the Spanish and Bulgarian members) were still operating in exile (though following Franco's death in 1975, the CNT was already approaching a membership of 200,000).

The Direct Action Movement was formed in 1979 when the remaining SWF branch and other smaller anarchist groups decided to form a new organisation of anarcho-syndicalists in Britain. The DAM was highly involved in the Miners' Strike and a series of industrial disputes later in the 1980s, including the Ardbride dispute in Ardrossan, Scotland, involving a supplier to Laura Ashley, for which the DAM received international support. From 1988 in Scotland, then England and Wales, the DAM was active in opposing the Poll Tax. In March 1994, DAM changed to its current name, the Solidarity Federation, having been the Direct Action Movement since 1979 and the Syndicalist Workers' Federation since 1950. The Solidarity Federation publishes the quarterly magazine Direct Action (presently on hiatus) and the newspaper Catalyst. In 1979, a split over representative unionism, professional unionism and state-funded schemes saw the CNT divided into two sections, the CNT as it is today and the Confederacion General del Trabajo. After Franco's death in November 1975 and the beginning of Spain's transition to democracy, the CNT was the only social movement to refuse to sign the 1977 Moncloa Pact, an agreement amongst politicians, political parties and trade unions to plan how to operate the economy during the transition. In 1979, the CNT held its first congress since 1936 and several mass meetings, the most remarkable one in Montjuïc. Views put forward in this congress would set the pattern for the CNT's line of action for the following decades: no participation in union elections, no acceptance of state subsidies, no acknowledgement of works councils and support of union sections.

In this first congress, held in Madrid, a minority sector in favour of union elections split from the CNT, initially calling themselves CNT Valencia Congress (referring to the alternative congress held in this city) and later Confederación General del Trabajo (CGT) after an April 1989 court decision determined that they could not use the CNT initials. In 1990, a group of CGT members left this union because they rejected the CGT's policy of accepting government subsidies, founding Solidaridad Obrera. One year before, the 1978 Scala Case affected the CNT. An explosion killed three people in a Barcelona nightclub. The authorities alleged that striking workers "blew themselves up" and arrested surviving strikers, implicating them in the crime. CNT members declared that the prosecution sought to criminalize their organization.

Contemporary times 

After its legalization, the CNT began efforts to recover the expropriations of 1939. The basis for such recovery would be established by Law 4/1986, which required the return of the seized properties and the unions' right to use or yield the real estate. Since then, the CNT has been claiming the return of these properties from the State. In 1996, the Economic and Social Council facilities in Madrid were squatted by 105 CNT militants. This body is in charge of the repatriation of the accumulated union wealth. In 2004, an agreement was reached between the CNT and the District Attorney's Office, through which all charges were dropped against the hundred prosecuted for this occupation.

On 3 September 2009, six members of the Serbian IWA section (ASI-MUR), including then-IWA General Secretary Ratibor Trivunac, were arrested on suspicion of international terrorism, a charge that the international and other anarchist groups heavily disputed. Shortly after their arrest, an open letter was circulated by Serbian academics criticizing the charges and the attitude of the Serbian police. The six were indicted on 7 December, and after a lengthy trial procedure, Trivunac and the other five anarchists were freed on 17 February 2010. On 10 December 2009, the FAU local in Berlin was effectively banned as a union following a public industrial dispute at the city's Babylon cinema. At the 14th annual congress of the IWA, which was held in Brazil in December 2009, the first time the congress had been held outside Europe, motions of support were passed for the "Belgrade Six" and FAU while members of the Solidarity Federation temporarily took over duties as Secretariat. The International's Norwegian section subsequently took on the Secretariat role in 2010. As part of the anti-austerity movement in Europe, various IWA sections have been highly active in the 2008–2012 period, with the CNT taking a leading role in agitating for the general strikes that have occurred in Spain, the USI in Milan taking on anti-austerity campaigns in the health service and the ZSP organizing tenants against abuses in rented accommodation.

 in the form of the Confederación General del Trabajo (CGT) and the CNT. CGT membership was estimated at 100,000 in 2003. The regions with the largest CNT membership are the Centre (Madrid and surrounding area), the North (Basque country), Andalucía, Catalonia and the Balearic Islands. The CNT opposes the union elections and workplace committees model and is critical of labour reforms and the UGT and the CCOO, standing instead on a platform of reivindicación; that is, "return of what is due", or social revolution.

Green syndicalism 
Green syndicalism is a synthesis of anarcho-syndicalism and environmentalism, arguing that protection of the environment depends on decentralization, regionalism, direct action, autonomy, pluralism and federation. It primarily draws inspiration from the green bans in Australia, the efforts of workers at Lucas Aerospace to convert their factories away from armaments production and Judi Bari's efforts in the IWW to organise timber workers and environmentalists in Northern California. Green Syndicalism has been advocated for at various times by Confédération Nationale du Travail, Confederación General de Trabajadores and the Central Organisation of the Workers of Sweden.

Theory and politics 
 
Anarcho-syndicalists believe that direct action carried out by workers as opposed to indirect action, such as electing a representative to a government position, would allow workers to liberate themselves.

Anarcho-syndicalists believe that workers' organisations that oppose the wage system will eventually form the basis of a new society and should be self-managing. They should not have bosses or "business agents"; instead, the workers alone should decide on what affects them. Rudolf Rocker is one of the most influential figures in the anarcho-syndicalist movement.

Noam Chomsky, influenced by Rocker, wrote the introduction to a modern edition of Anarcho-syndicalism: Theory and Practice. A member of the Industrial Workers of the World (IWW), Chomsky is a self-described anarcho-syndicalist, a position that he sees as the appropriate application of classical liberal political theory to contemporary industrial society:

Criticism and response 

Anarcho-syndicalism has been criticised as anachronistic by some contemporary anarchists. In 1992, Murray Bookchin spoke against its reliance on an outdated view of work:

Bookchin has said that it prioritizes the interests of the working class instead of communal freedom for society as a whole; this view ultimately prevents a true revolution. He argues that in instances like the Spanish Revolution, it was despite the syndicalist-minded CNT leadership that the revolution occurred.

Direct action, one of the main staples of anarcho-syndicalism, would extend into the political sphere, according to its supporters. To them, the labour council is the federation of all workplace branches of all industries in a geographical area "territorial basis of organisation linkage brought all the workers from one area together and fomented working-class solidarity over and before corporate solidarity". Rudolf Rocker argued:

Anarcho-syndicalism, therefore, is not apolitical but instead sees political and economic activity as the same. Unlike the propositions of some of its critics, anarcho-syndicalism is different from reformist union activity in that it aims to obliterate capitalism as "[anarcho-syndicalism] has a double aim: with tireless persistence, it must pursue betterment of the working class's current conditions. But, without letting themselves become obsessed with this passing concern, the workers should take care to make possible and imminent the essential act of comprehensive emancipation: the expropriation of capital".

While collectivist and communist anarchists criticise syndicalism as having the potential to exclude the voices of citizens and consumers outside of the union, anarcho-syndicalists argue that labour councils will work outside of the workplace and within the community to encourage community and consumer participation in economic and political activity (even workers and consumers outside of the union or nation) and will work to form and maintain the institutions necessary in any society such as schools, libraries, homes and so on. Bookchin argues:

In popular culture 
 The 1975 comedy film Monty Python and the Holy Grail makes reference to anarcho-syndicalism. King Arthur becomes frustrated when a character named Dennis explains the anarcho-syndicalist commune in which he lives. The situation is exacerbated when Dennis insults Arthur's claim to Excalibur and the kingship of the Britons. Arthur, fed up, assaults Dennis and leaves, an incident that Dennis refers to as "the violence inherent in the system".
 Ursula K. Le Guin's novel The Dispossessed (1974) shows a fictional functioning anarcho-syndicalist society. The novel is subtitled "An Ambiguous Utopia".

See also 

 General strike
 Kronstadt rebellion
 Libertarian socialism
 List of federations of trade unions
 Participatory economics
 Wildcat strike action
 Workers' self-management
 Syndicalism
 Socialism
 left-libertarianism
 Anti-capitalism
 Unionism

References

Bibliography

Further reading 
 Federation, Solidarity, Fighting for ourselves: Anarcho-syndicalism and the class struggle - Solidarity Federation, Freedom Press, 2012 
 Flank, Lenny (ed), IWW: A Documentary History, Red and Black Publishers, St Petersburg, Florida, 2007.  
 Rocker, Rudolf, Anarchism and Anarcho-Syndicalism

External links 

 A comprehensive list of Anarcho-syndicalist organisations
 What is revolutionary syndicalism? An ongoing historical series on anarcho-syndicalism and revolutionary syndicalism from a communist perspective
 Anarcho-Syndicalism 101
 Anarcho-Syndicalist Review
 Syndicalism: Myth and Reality
 Revolutionary Unionism: Yesterday, Today, Tomorrow by Dan Jakopovich
 Anarcho-Syndicalism texts from the Kate Sharpley Library
 "Syndicalism". "Revolutionary syndicalism". Encyclopædia Britannica. 

 
Syndicalism
Syndicalism
Anti-capitalism
Economic ideologies
Far-left politics
Syndicalism
History of social movements
Libertarian socialism
Political ideologies
Syndicalism
Types of socialism